Steller's jay (Cyanocitta stelleri) is a bird native to western North America and the mountains of Central America, closely related to the blue jay found in eastern North America. It is also known as the long-crested jay, mountain jay, and pine jay. It is the only crested jay west of the Rocky Mountains. It is also sometimes colloquially called a "blue jay" in the Pacific Northwest, but is distinct from the blue jay (C. cristata) of eastern North America. The species inhabits pine-oak and coniferous forests.

Description

Steller's jay shows a great deal of regional variation throughout its range. Blackish-brown-headed birds from the north gradually become bluer-headed farther south. The Steller's jay has a more slender bill and longer legs than the blue jay and, in northern populations, has a much more pronounced crest. It is also somewhat larger.

The head is blackish-brown, black, or dark blue, depending on the subspecies of the bird, with lighter streaks on the forehead. This dark coloring gives way from the shoulders and lower breast to silvery blue. The primaries and tail are a rich blue with darker barring. Birds in the eastern part of its range along the Great Divide have white markings on the head, especially over the eyes; birds further west have light blue markers and birds in the far west along the Pacific Coast have small, very faint, or no white or light markings at all.

Phylogeny

Steller's jay (Cyanocitta stelleri) is one of two species in the genus Cyanocitta, the other species being the blue jay (Cyanocitta cristata); because the two species sometimes interbreed naturally where their ranges overlap in the eastern foothills of the Rocky Mountains, their status as distinct species has been contested. There are 18 subspecies of Steller's jays ranging from Alaska to Nicaragua, with nine found north of Mexico, often with areas of low or non-existent presence of the species separating the subspecies. At least some of the variation in the species is due to different degrees of hybridization between Steller's jays (C. stelleri) and blue jays (C. cristata).

The genus Cyanocitta is part of the passerine family Corvidae, which consists of the crows, ravens, rooks, jackdaws, jays, magpies, treepies, choughs, and nutcrackers.

Habitat

Steller's jay occurs in most of the forested areas of western North America as far east as the eastern foothills of the Rocky Mountains from southern Alaska in the north to northern Nicaragua in the south completely replacing the blue jay prevalent on the rest of the continent in those areas. Its density is lower in the central Rocky Mountain region (Montana, Idaho, Wyoming and eastern Utah) plus the desert or scrubland areas of the Great Basin (e.g. Nevada, western Utah, southern Arizona and parts of California). Some hybridization with the blue jay in eastern foothills of the Rocky Mountains, especially Colorado, has been reported. It is also found in Mexico occurring through the interior highlands in northwestern Mexico as well as patchy populations in the rest of Mexico. In the northern end of its range it appears to be spreading from coastal Southeast Alaska across the Coast Mountains into southern Yukon Territory.

Steller's jay is also found in Mexico's interior highlands from Chihuahua and Sonora in the northwest southward to Jalisco, as well as other patchy populations found throughout Mexico. It is also found in south-central Guatemala, northern El Salvador, Honduras and Nicaragua.

Although Steller's jay primarily lives in coniferous forests, it can be found in other types of forests as well. They can be found from low to moderate elevations, and on rare occasions to as high as the tree line. Steller's jays are common in residential and agricultural areas with nearby forests.

Diet

Steller's jays are omnivores; their diet is about two-thirds plant matter and one-third animal matter. They gather food both from the ground and from trees. Steller's jay's diet includes a wide range of seeds, nuts, berries and other fruit. They also eat many types of invertebrates, small rodents, eggs, and nestlings such as those of the marbled murrelet. There are some accounts of them eating small reptiles, both snakes and lizards.

Acorns and conifer seeds are staples during the non-breeding season; these are often cached in the ground or in trees for later consumption. They exploit human-provided food sources, frequently scavenging picnics and campsites, where it competes with the Canada jay.

Steller's jays will visit feeders and prefer black-oil sunflower seeds, white striped sunflower seeds, cracked corn, shelled raw peanuts, and are especially attracted to whole raw peanuts. Suet is also consumed but mostly in the winter season.

Breeding
Steller's jays breed in monogamous pairs. The clutch is usually incubated entirely by the female for about 16 days. The male feeds the female during this time. Though they are known to be loud both day and night, during nesting they are quiet in order to not attract attention.

The nest is usually in a conifer, but is sometimes built in a hollow in a tree or beneath the awning of a house or other structure. Similar in construction to the blue jay's nest, it tends to be a bit larger, using a number of natural materials or scavenged trash, often mixed with mud. Between two and six eggs are laid during breeding season. The eggs are oval in shape with a somewhat glossy surface. The background colour of the egg shell tends to be pale variations of greenish-blue with brown- or olive-coloured speckles.

Vocalizations
Like other jays, the Steller's jay has numerous and variable vocalizations. One common call is a harsh "SHACK-Sheck-sheck-sheck-sheck-sheck" series; another "skreeka! skreeka!" call sounds almost exactly like an old-fashioned pump handle; yet another is a soft, breathy "hoodle hoodle" whistle. Its alarm call is a harsh, nasal "wah". Some calls are sex-specific: females produce a rattling sound, while males make a high-pitched "gleep gleep".

The Steller's jay is also a noted mimic: it can imitate the vocalizations of many species of birds, other animals, and sounds of non-animal origin. It often will imitate the calls from birds of prey such as the red-tailed hawk, red-shouldered hawk, and osprey as a warning of danger to others or territorial behavior, causing other birds to seek cover and flee feeding areas.

Steller's Jays have the ability to assess risk using different predator detection cues. They have many alarm calls that are dependent on their interaction between predator identity and cue type. Steller's Jays respond to Sharp Shinned Hawks with a longer latency to return to feeding whether they are both seen or heard. In contrast to Steller's Jays, Sharp Shinned Hawks responded to Northern Goshawks with a longer latency to resume feeding if they were seen in comparison to only heard. The difference in reactions suggest that this is a distinct risk of assessment being conducted by the Steller's Jays. Steller's Jays will then vary the production of their "wah", "wek", and mimic red-tailed hawk calls in response to different detection cues.

Etymology
This bird is named after the German naturalist Georg Wilhelm Steller, the first European to record them, in 1741. Johann Friedrich Gmelin formally named the species after Steller in the 13th edition of Systema Naturae (first published in 1788).

Provincial bird
The Steller's jay is the provincial bird of the Canadian province of British Columbia.

References

Further reading

External links

 
 
 

Steller's jay
Native birds of Alaska
Native birds of Western Canada
Provincial symbols of British Columbia
Native birds of the Western United States
Fauna of the California chaparral and woodlands
Fauna of the San Francisco Bay Area
Birds of the Rio Grande valleys
Birds of Mexico
Birds of the Sierra Madre Occidental
Birds of the Sierra Madre del Sur
Steller's jay
Taxa named by Johann Friedrich Gmelin